San Luis Obispo County, officially the County of San Luis Obispo, is a county on the Central Coast of California. As of the 2020 census, the population was 282,424. The county seat is San Luis Obispo.

Junípero Serra founded the Mission San Luis Obispo de Tolosa in 1772, and San Luis Obispo grew around it. The small size of the county's communities, scattered along the beaches, coastal hills, and mountains of the Santa Lucia range, provides a wide variety of coastal and inland hill ecologies to support fishing, agriculture, and tourist activities.

California Polytechnic State University has almost 20,000 students. Tourism, especially for the wineries, is popular. Grapes and other agriculture products are an important part of the economy. San Luis Obispo County is the third largest producer of wine in California, surpassed only by Sonoma and Napa counties. Strawberries are the largest agricultural crop in the county.

The town of San Simeon is located at the foot of the ridge where newspaper publisher William Randolph Hearst built Hearst Castle. Other coastal towns (listed from north to south) include  Cambria, Cayucos, Morro Bay, and Los Osos -Baywood Park.  These cities and villages are located northwest of the city of San Luis Obispo. To the south are Avila Beach and the Five Cities region. The Five Cities originally were: Arroyo Grande, Grover Beach (then known as Grover City), Oceano, Fair Oaks and Halcyon. Today, the Five Cities region consists of Pismo Beach, Grover Beach, Arroyo Grande, Oceano, and Halcyon (basically the area from Pismo Beach to Oceano). Just south of the Five Cities, San Luis Obispo County borders northern Santa Barbara County. Inland, the cities of Paso Robles, Templeton, and Atascadero lie along the Salinas River, near the Paso Robles wine region. San Luis Obispo lies south of Atascadero and north of the Five Cities region.

History

The prehistory of San Luis Obispo County is strongly influenced by the Chumash people. There has been significant settlement here at least as early as the Millingstone Horizon thousands of years ago. Important settlements existed in coastal areas such as Morro Bay and Los Osos.

Mission San Luis Obispo de Tolosa was founded on September 1, 1772 in the area that is now the city of San Luis Obispo. The namesake of the mission, city and county is Saint Louis of Toulouse, the young bishop of Toulouse (Obispo and Tolosa in Spanish) in 1297.

San Luis Obispo County was one of the original counties of California, created in 1850 at the time of statehood.

The Salinas River Valley, a region that figures strongly in several John Steinbeck novels, stretches north from San Luis Obispo County.

Geography

Climate
 San Luis Obispo County has three main climate types. BSk climate can mainly be found in the eastern portions of the county, along with certain smaller areas in the north. Csa climate can mainly be found in the central portions of the counties, in communities such as Paso Robles. The rest of the county is made up of the Csb climate type.

Adjacent counties

National protected areas
 Carrizo Plain National Monument (part)
 Guadalupe-Nipomo Dunes National Wildlife Refuge (part)
 Los Padres National Forest (part)

Marine Protected Areas

Piedras Blancas State Marine Reserve and Marine Conservation Area
Cambria State Marine Conservation Area
White Rock (Cambria) State Marine Conservation Area
Morro Bay State Marine Recreational Management Area and Morro Bay State Marine Reserve
Point Buchon State Marine Reserve and Marine Conservation Area

Demographics

2020 census

Note: the US Census treats Hispanic/Latino as an ethnic category. This table excludes Latinos from the racial categories and assigns them to a separate category. Hispanics/Latinos can be of any race.

2011

Places by population, race, and income

2010
The 2010 United States Census reported that San Luis Obispo County had a population of 269,637. The racial makeup of San Luis Obispo County was 222,756 (82.6%) White, 5,550 (2.1%) African American, 2,536 (0.9%) Native American, 8,507 (3.2%) Asian (1.0% Filipino, 0.6% Chinese, 0.4% Japanese, 0.3% Indian, 0.3% Korean, 0.2% Vietnamese), 389 (0.1%) Pacific Islander, 19,786 (7.3%) from other races, and 10,113 (3.8%) from two or more races. Hispanic or Latino of any race were 55,973 persons (20.8%); 17.7% of San Luis Obispo County is Mexican, 0.3% Puerto Rican, and 0.2% Salvadoran.

2000 Census
As of the census of 2000, there were 246,681 residents, 92,739 households, and 58,611 families in the county. The population density was 75 people per square mile (29/km2). There were 102,275 housing units at an average density of 31 per square mile (12/km2). The racial makeup of the county was 84.6% White, 2.0% Black or African American, 1.0% Native American, 2.7% Asian, 0.1% Pacific Islander, 6.2% from other races, and 3.4% from two or more races. 16.3% of the population were Hispanic or Latino of any race. 13.9% were of German, 11.4% English, 9.7% Irish, 6.1% American and 5.7% Italian ancestry according to Census 2000. 85.7% spoke English and 10.7% Spanish as their first language.

There were 92,739 households, out of which 28.2% had children under the age of 18 living with them, 50.40% were married couples living together, 9.1% had a female householder with no husband present, and 36.8% were non-families. 26.0% of all households were made up of individuals, and 10.3% had someone living alone who was 65 years of age or older. The average household size was 2.49 and the average family size was 3.01.

In the county, the population was spread out, with 21.7% under the age of 18, 13.6% from 18 to 24, 27.0% from 25 to 44, 23.3% from 45 to 64, and 14.5% who were 65 years of age or older. The median age was 37 years. For every 100 females there were 105.6 males. For every 100 females age 18 and over, there were 105.2 males.

The median income for a household in the county was $42,428, and the median income for a family was $52,447. Males had a median income of $40,726 versus $27,450 for females. The per capita income for the county was $21,864. About 6.8% of families and 12.8% of the population were below the poverty line, including 11.4% of those under age 18 and 5.9% of those age 65 or over.

Economy

The mainstays of the economy are California Polytechnic State University with its almost 20,000 students, tourism, and agriculture.

San Luis Obispo County's economy is primarily a service economy. Service jobs account for 38% of the County's jobs, government jobs accounts for 20.7%, and manufacturing jobs represent 6% of the County's jobs.

San Luis Obispo County is the third largest producer of wine in California, surpassed only by Sonoma and Napa counties. Wine grapes are the second largest agricultural crop in the county (after strawberries), and the wine production they support creates a direct economic impact and a growing wine country vacation industry.

The county led the state in hemp cultivation in 2018 as hundreds of acres of the crop were grown in research partnerships. In 2019, nine agricultural research permits were still active. Sixteen commercial permits were issued before a temporary ban on new applications running through June 2020 was passed by the Board of Supervisors.

Politics

Voter registration

Cities by population and voter registration

Overview 
San Luis Obispo County leaned toward the Republican Party in presidential and congressional elections during the most of the 20th century; it has, however, become more Democratic starting in the 2000s. In 2008, Barack Obama won the county with 51.2 percent of the vote.  Prior to 2008, the last Democrat to win a majority in the county was Lyndon Johnson in 1964, although Bill Clinton won a plurality in 1992. In 2012, Obama again won the county, this time with a slim plurality of the vote. Hillary Clinton won with a larger plurality in 2016; and in 2020, Joe Biden won a solid 55% of the vote, the largest for any Democrat since Lyndon Johnson in 1964.

  
  
  
  
  
  
  
  
  
  
  
  
  
  
  
  
  
  
  
  
  
  
  
  
  
  
  
  
  
  
  

County voters supported Republican Meg Whitman in 2010 and Democrat Jerry Brown in 2014. The previous Democrat to carry the county in a gubernatorial election was Gray Davis in 1998.

From 2003 until 2013, the county was split between the Bakersfield-based 22nd district, which was represented by Republican Kevin McCarthy and included Paso Robles and most of the more conservative inland areas of the county, and Lois Capps' 23rd district, a strip which included most of the county's more liberal coastal areas as well as coastal areas of Santa Barbara and Ventura counties.

In April 2008, the California Secretary of State reported that there were 147,326 registered voters in San Luis Obispo County. Of those voters, 61,226 (41.6%) were registered Republicans, 52,586 (35.7%) were registered Democratic, 8,030 (5.4%) are registered with other political parties, and 25,484 (17.3%) declined to state a political preference. The cities of Grover Beach, Morro Bay, and San Luis Obispo had pluralities or majorities of registered Democratic voters, whereas the rest of the county's towns, cities, and the unincorporated areas have a plurality or majority of registered Republican voters.

Crime 

The following table includes the number of incidents reported and the rate per 1,000 persons for each type of offense.

Cities by population and crime rates

Transportation

Major highways

 U.S. Route 101
 State Route 1
 State Route 33
 State Route 41
 State Route 46
 State Route 58
 State Route 166
 State Route 227
 State Route 229

Public transportation
San Luis Obispo County is served by Amtrak trains and Greyhound Lines buses.
The San Luis Obispo Regional Transit Authority provides countywide service along US 101 as well as service to Morro Bay, Los Osos, Cambria and San Simeon.

The cities of San Luis Obispo, Atascadero and Paso Robles operate their own local bus services; 
all of these connect with SLORTA routes.

Intercity service is provided by Amtrak trains, Greyhound Lines and Orange Belt Stages buses.

Airports
San Luis Obispo County Regional Airport (SBP) is located just south of the City of San Luis Obispo. Commercial flights are available.
 Paso Robles Municipal Airport (PRB) is located north-east of the City of Paso Robles and is home to California Highway Patrol, CAL-FIRE and the Estrella Warbirds Museum.
Oceano County Airport (L52) is located on the coast in the 5 Cities area.

Future 
In the future, SR 46 may be considered for a possible westward expansion of Interstate 40 via SR 58 from Barstow to Bakersfield, from Bakersfield to I-5 via Westside Parkway, and then following SR 46 to Paso Robles. SR 46 is slowly being upgraded to Interstate standards, minus overpasses between Interstate 5 and US Route 101.

Communities

Cities
Arroyo Grande
Atascadero
Grover Beach
Morro Bay
Paso Robles
Pismo Beach
San Luis Obispo (county seat)

Unincorporated communities

 Avila Beach
 Baywood Park
 Blacklake
 California Polytechnic State University
 California Valley
Callender
Cambria
Cayucos
Creston
 Cholame
Edna
Garden Farms
 Halcyon
 Harmony
Lake Nacimiento
Los Berros
Los Osos
Los Ranchos
Nipomo
Oak Shores
Oceano
 Pozo
San Miguel
 San Simeon
Santa Margarita
Shandon
Templeton
Whitley Gardens
Woodlands

Population ranking

The population ranking of the following table is based on the 2020 census of San Luis Obispo County.

† county seat

See also

San Luis Obispo County Search and Rescue
List of museums in the California Central Coast
List of school districts in San Luis Obispo County, California
National Register of Historic Places listings in San Luis Obispo County, California
 San Luis Obispo Pioneer, the county's first newspaper
 Dalidio Ranch Project controversy, a controversy involving San Luis Obispo County
 Amphibious Training Base Morro Bay

Notes

Footnotes

Further reading

 Charles Montville Gidney, Benjamin Brooks, and Edwin M. Sheridan, History of Santa Barbara, San Luis Obispo and Ventura Counties, California. In Two Volumes. Chicago: Lewis Publishing Co., 1917. Volume 1 | Volume 2
 Yda Addis Storke, A Memorial and Biographical History of the Counties of Santa Barbara, San Luis Obispo and Ventura, California...  Chicago: Lewis Publishing Co., 1891.

External links

 
California counties
1850 establishments in California
Populated places established in 1850